Richard Francis McGonagle (born October 22, 1946) is an American actor. He is perhaps best known for his voice work in various video games, movies and television shows. He is also known for his work by voicing Colonel Taggart in Prototype, Orlovsky in World in Conflict: Soviet Assault, Mr. Incredible through various The Incredibles projects (in lieu of Craig T. Nelson), Victor Sullivan in the Uncharted franchise, Four Arms and Exo-Skull in the Ben 10 franchise, Bato in Avatar: The Last Airbender, Dr. Peace in No More Heroes, Eight-Armed Willy in The Marvelous Misadventures of Flapjack, Dr. I.Q. Hi in Duck Dodgers, Apocalypse in X-Men Legends II: Rise of Apocalypse, Ed Machine in Scooby-Doo! Mystery Incorporated, Tom Sheldon in Just Cause, Abin Sur in Green Lantern: First Flight, and Bill the Wrangler in Spirit: Stallion of the Cimarron, and provided additional voices for The Incredible Hulk: Ultimate Destruction, Pirates of the Caribbean: At World's End, World in Conflict, The Rise of the Argonauts, Dragon Age: Origins, Regular Show, OK K.O.! Let's Be Heroes  and Samurai Jack.

Life and career
McGonagle was born in Boston, Massachusetts on October 22, 1946, the son of Hildagard Virginia (née Hiller) and William Francis McGonagle.

As a voice actor he has done many roles such as Four Arms and Exo-Skull on Ben 10, several voices on the show Samurai Jack, as Bato, a secondary character from Avatar: The Last Airbender, various people in Zatch Bell, Bill the Wrangler in Spirit: Stallion of the Cimarron, Dr. I.Q. Hi in Duck Dodgers, Apocalypse in X-Men Legends II: Rise of Apocalypse, the second voice of General Grievous in Star Wars: Clone Wars, Ed Machine in Scooby-Doo! Mystery Incorporated, Abin Sur in Green Lantern: First Flight, and various teachers in Recess. He was one of the voice directors on Beyblade, and did various voices on Rugrats and All Grown Up! and adult voices on The Buzz on Maggie. He also provided the voice of the Oracle in Jak 3 and voiced Dr. Peace in No More Heroes, and Eight-Armed Willy in The Marvelous Misadventures of Flapjack, also voiced Herb (Starla's Father) in Regular Show.

He also voiced in video games such as Baten Kaitos Origins, Metal Gear Solid 3: Snake Eater, the Uncharted series (also motion capture), Just Cause, The Incredible Hulk: Ultimate Destruction, Dragon Age: Origins and Castle of Illusion Starring Mickey Mouse. In film, he appeared in The Bucket List for Warner Bros. Pictures. He narrated the acclaimed indie film (500) Days of Summer, starring Joseph Gordon-Levitt and Zooey Deschanel. He has also narrated a number of audiobooks, including the New York Times bestseller The Dark Side, by New Yorker journalist Jane Mayer.

In television, he has appeared in an episode of Star Trek: The Next Generation and two episodes of Star Trek: Voyager. He played the recurring character Judge Lathrop in the crime drama Close to Home and provided the voice of Sanders on the sitcom Community in the second-season episode "Basic Rocket Science". He appeared in the TV series Rules of Engagement as a doctor.

Filmography

Film
 Union City (1980) - Man in Crowd
 Tattoo (1981) - Texan's Friend #1
 Man, Woman and Child (1983) - Faculty Member #6
 The Man with One Red Shoe (1985) - CIA Agent
 Howard the Duck (1986) - First Cop
 Innerspace (1987) - Cop #2
 14 Going on 30 (1988, TV Movie) - Danny's Dad
 Dad (1989) - Victor Walton
 Speechless (1994) - Dignitary
 The American President (1995) - Rumson Staffer
 Too Good to Be True (1997) - Spencer
 Senseless (1998) - Robert Bellwether
 Mighty Joe Young (1998) - Panda Owner
 Rules of Engagement (2000) - Judge Col. E. Warner
 Critical Mass (2001) - Adam Gould
 Spirit: Stallion of the Cimarron (2002) - Bill (voice)
 The Bucket List (2007) - Board Chairman
 500 Days of Summer (2009) - Narrator (voice)
 The Consultants (2009) - Cutter

Television
 21 Jump Street – Mr. Bill Weckerle
 3rd Rock from the Sun – Dr. Howard
 The A-Team – Pete Peterson (episode: "There Goes the Neighborhood")
 Ally McBeal – District Attorney Moon (episode: "Reasons to Believe")
 The Adventures of Brisco County, Jr. – Ashenden (episode: "Stagecoach")
 Anything but Love – Priest (episode: "Bang You're Dead")
 Better Off Ted – Manny (episode: "Get Happy")
 Blacke's Magic – Leon (episode: "Breathing Room")
 Boston Legal – A.A.G. Norman Wood (episode: "Patriot Acts")
 Brooklyn South – William "Woody" McKenzie
 CBS Schoolbreak Special – Tom (episode: "Gambler")
 Charmed – Woogy, Gasman (episode: "Is There a Woogy in the House?")
 Cheers – Customer #2 (episode: "The Tortelli Tort")
 Civil Wars - Judge Mandelberg
 The Client – Minister Richards (episode: "The Good Samaritan")
 Close to Home – Judge Lathrop
 Clueless – Mr. Wilcox (episode: "Mercy Date")
 Community – Sanders (episode: "Basic Rocket Science")
 Days of Our Lives – Bishop Andrews, Friar Peter
 Dirty Sexy Money – Bishop Bascombe
 Falcon Crest – Auctioneer (episode: "Flash Point")
 Fame – Simon Marshall (episode: "Beginnings")
 Family Ties – Male Customer, Brother Timothy
 Fantasy Island – Phillip Woodson (episode: "Secret Self")
 General Hospital – Kincaid
 Harry's Law – Judge (episode: "American Girl")
 Highway to Heaven – Martin (episode: "Keep Smiling")
 Hill Street Blues – Dr. Sandler (episode: "The Life and Time of Dominic Florio Jr.")
 Hunter – Detective Levine (episode: "Hunter")
 JAG – Captain Richard Carey
 L.A. Law – Ackley Atwood-Wade (episode: "Sidney, the Dead-Nosed Reindeer")
 Life's Work – Carl Bieber (episode: "Harassment")
 Loving – Clem Margolies 
 Mama's Family – Arthur Booth (episode: "A Taxing Situation")
 Matlock – Dr. Eldon McNeeley (episode: "The Accident")
 Me and the Boys – Tom (episode: "The Kiss-Off")
 Melrose Place – Probation Officer (episode: "The Cook, the Creep, His Lover and Her Sister")
 The Middle – Doctor (episode: "The Sit Down")
 Moonlighting – Detective Barber 
 Mr. Belvedere – Announcer #1 (episode: "The Field")
 Murder One – Judge Owen Harris
 The New Mike Hammer – Joe Barry (episode: "Warpath")
 Night Court – Andrew (episode: "Pop Goes the Question")
 Nip/Tuck – Roger McGuinness (episode: "Dan Daly")
 Over My Dead Body – Hargrove (episode: "Pilot")
 Pacific Blue – Police Chief Rod Sherman
 Party of Five – Emmett
 Perfect Strangers – Zitell (episode: "Crimebusters")
 Picket Fences – FBI Agent (episode: Terms of Estrangement")
 The Practice – Judge Patrick Wilcox
 Quantum Leap – Dad Wilson (episode: "Camikazi Kid – June 6, 1961")
 Remington Steele – Colby, Clerk
 Rituals – Phillip Mason
 Roswell – General Edward Chambers (episode: "Control")
 Rules of Engagement – Dr. Sachs, Doctor
 The Secret World of Alex Mack – Judd DuBrow (episode: "Local Hero")
 Seinfeld – Mr. Star (episode: "The Maestro")
 Simon & Simon – FBI Man #1 (episode: "Full Moon Blues")
 Sisters – Dr. Eastman (episode: "Not in a Million Years")
 Snoops – William Keller (episode: "True Believers")
 Star Trek: The Next Generation – Dr. Ja'Dar (episode: "New Ground")
 Star Trek: Voyager – Commander Pete Harkins (episodes: "Pathfinder" and "Inside Man")
 T. J. Hooker – Joe Doyle (episode: "King of the Hill")
 Titus – Dr. Phine (episode: "Locking Up Mom")
 The Torkelsons – Howard Roberts (episode: "Fence Neighbors")
 The Twilight Zone – Lester (Segment: "Her Pilgrim Soul")
 University Hospital – Dr. Ross (episode: "Endings and Beginnings")
 Veronica's Closet – Stanley
 Walt Disney's Wonderful World of Color – Dr. Richard Wwintraub, Danny Scott
 The West Wing – Sen. Warren, D (episode: "18th and Potomac")
 Wings – Reverend Powell (episode: "Ex, Lies and Videotape")
 The X-Files – Dr. Francis Orovetz (episode: "Deadalive")
 Zoe, Duncan, Jack and Jane – Art (episode: "The Feud")

Animated film

Animation

Video games

References

External links
 
 
 

1946 births
Living people
American male film actors
American male television actors
American male video game actors
American male voice actors
Male actors from Boston